The parish of St. Michael is one of eleven parishes of Barbados. Saint Michael has survived by name as one of the original six parishes created in 1629 by Governor Sir William Tufton.

The parish is home to Bridgetown, the capital of Barbados. Bridgetown is the centre of commercial activity in Barbados, as well as a central hub for the public transport network. Other major infrastructure in St. Michael is the international seaport of Barbados—the Deep Water Harbour. Therein, a number of cruise ships arrive and depart including various lines such as Royal Caribbean and Cunard. The harbour features several sugar towers for loading locally produced sugar into transport ships, and a tower for loading flour for transport.
 The Needham's Point Lighthouse is located in Needham's Point, Saint Michael, behind the new Hilton Barbados Hotel.

Under Barbados's historical vestry system, the main parish church (St Michael's Cathedral) is sited in St Michael's Row in Bridgetown. The cathedral replaced the former parish church that was located at the site of St Mary's Church. St Michael's Cathedral was elevated to cathedral status under Bishop Coleridge, who arrived in Barbados in 1825 to head the newly created Diocese of Barbados and the Leeward Islands.

Geography

Populated places
The parish contains the following towns, villages, localities, settlements, communities and hamlets:

Parishes bordering Saint Michael 
Christ Church - South
Saint George - East
Saint James - Northwest
Saint Thomas - Northeast

Defined boundaries 
with Christ Church: – Starts from the meeting point of the parishes of St. George, St. Michael, and Christ Church and proceeds southerly along the plantation track and the boundary between the residential developments called Fort George Heights and Kent House to the boundary junction with public road called Highway R. Then it moves westerly along Highway R to its junction at Wildey with the Airport to West Coast Highway. Then it goes southerly along the Highway to merge at Clapham with the public road called Highway 6, then go north-westerly along Highway 6 to its junction with the public Observatory Road, then moves southerly along Observatory Road to its junction with the public Fordes Road. Then moving south-westerly, north-westerly and northerly along Fordes Road, Bonnett’s Road and Brittons New Road to its junction with Dalkeith Hill, then westerly along Dalkeith Hill to its junction with Deighton Road; then in a generally northern direction along Deighton Road to its junction with Dayrells Road. Along Dayrells Road in a south-westerly, north-westerly and westerly direction to its junction with Dalkeith Road at the Garrison, then continuing along Dalkeith Road generally south-westerly to its junction with the public road Highway 7; then directly across Highway 7 and continuing in a south-westerly direction along the road leading to Gravesend Beach and directly to the sea.

with St. George: – Starting from the meeting point of the parishes of St. George, St. Michael, and Christ Church and proceeding in a westerly and northerly direction along the plantation track to its junction at Lower Burney with the public road  Highway 5; then westerly along Highway 5 to its junction at Mapp Hill and the public road Haynes Hill.

with St. James: – Starting from the meeting point of the parishes of St. James, St. Thomas, and St. Michael and proceeding generally westwards along the public road called Clermont Road to its junction with the public road called Husbands Road; then in a southerly direction along this road to its junction with University Drive; then in a westerly and southerly direction along University Drive to the centre of the roundabout at the intersection of this road and Highway 1; then in a north-westerly direction along Highway 1 to a point just south of its junction with an unclassified road called Batt's Rock Road; then from this point in a straight line (bearing 263°07'21") through a monument (B. 18) to the sea.

with St. Thomas: – Starting from the meeting point of the parishes of St. Thomas, St. George, and St. Michael and proceeding along Highway E in a south-westerly direction to the junction with the public road running from Canewood to Jackson; then in a westerly, northerly and north-westerly direction to the junction at Jackson with the public road called Highway 2; then in a south-westerly direction along this road to the centre of the roundabout at its junction at Warrens with the Airport to West Coast Highway; then in a north-westerly direction along this Highway to the centre of the roundabout which is its junction with the public road called Highway 2A; then in a northerly direction along this road to the meeting point of the parishes of St. Thomas, St. James, and St. Michael.

House constituencies 
City of Bridgetown
Saint Michael-Central
Saint Michael-East
Saint Michael-North
Saint Michael-North East
Saint Michael-North West
Saint Michael-South
Saint Michael-South Central
Saint Michael-South East
Saint Michael-West
Saint Michael-West Central

Places 
Found in St. Michael are:
Caribbean Broadcasting Corporation, Pine
Caribbean Development Bank, Wildey
The Sir Gary Sobers Sports complex
The Kensington Oval
The National stadium, Waterford
The Lloyd Erskine Sandiford Centre, Two Mile Hill
The Black Rock Psychiatric Hospital, commonly called 'Jenkins'
The Queen Elizabeth Hospital, Barbados' primary health care facility
State House, formerly Government House, the official residence of the President of Barbados
Various government offices such as the Ministry of Education and the Ministry of Industry and International Business

Economy 
Kayla Foods Int'l (Barbados) Inc., an international division of Yogen Früz, is located in Saint Michael.

Education 

Schools located in St. Michael include:
American University of Barbados
American University of Integrative Sciences
Ann Hill School
Barbados Community College
Cave Hill Campus of the University of the West Indies
Cave Hill School of Business
Charles F. Broome Memorial Primary School
Combermere School
Erdiston Primary School and Special Unit
Erdiston Teachers' Training College
Graydon Sealy Secondary School
Harrison College
Irving Wilson School
Parkinson Memorial Secondary School
Ross University School of Medicine
Samuel Jackman Prescod Polytechnic
Springer Girls' Memorial Secondary School
St. Leonard's Boys' Secondary School
The St. Michael School

Notable people 
Tino Best, cricketer
Stede Bonnet, land owner turned pirate, known as “The Gentleman Pirate”
Marsha K. Caddle, politician, economist and Minister of Finance, Economic Affairs and Investment
London Bourne, former slave who became a wealthy merchant and landowner
Annalee Davis, Barbadian-born visual artist
 Sir Wes Hall, cricketer and former Minister for Sport & Tourism
Shai Hope, cricketer
Elvis Joseph, former National Football League running back, first professional American Football player from Barbados
Anthony Kellman, poet, novelist and musician
Frank Marshall, Anglican Dean of Barbados, based at the Cathedral Church of Saint Michael and All Angels in Saint Michael
Velma Scantlebury, first woman African American transplant surgeon in the United States, born in Goodland, St Michael
Rihanna (Robyn Rihanna Fenty), singer, rapper, songwriter, actress, designer, ambassador, entrepreneur
 Sir Garfield Sobers, cricketer
Nellie Weekes (1896–1990) – campaigner for women's rights, who ran for office in 1942, before women were allowed to vote in the country.

References 

 
Parishes of Barbados